is a railway station located in the city of  Daisen, Akita Prefecture, Japan, operated by  JR East.

Lines
Uguisuno Station is served by the Tazawako Line, and is located 61.6 km from the terminus of the line at Morioka Station.

Station layout
The station consists of one side platform serving a single  bi-directional traffic. There is no station building, but only a shelter built on the platform. The station is unattended.

History
Uguisuno Station opened on November 21, 1965 as a station on the Japan National Railways (JNR) serving the town of Nakasen, Akita. The station was absorbed into the JR East network upon the privatization of the JNR on April 1, 1987.

Surrounding area

See also
 List of Railway Stations in Japan

External links

 JR East Station information 

Railway stations in Japan opened in 1965
Railway stations in Akita Prefecture
Tazawako Line
Daisen, Akita